Boggs Run is a  long 3rd order tributary to the Ohio River in Marshall County, West Virginia.

Course
Boggs Run rises about 0.25 miles northwest of Sherrard, West Virginia, and then flows northwesterly to join the Ohio River at the south end of Wheeling, West Virginia.

Watershed
Boggs Run drains  of area, receives about 41.4 in/year of precipitation, has a wetness index of 269.18, and is about 67% forested.

See also
List of rivers of West Virginia

References

Rivers of West Virginia
Rivers of Marshall County, West Virginia
Tributaries of the Ohio River